Corn Hill may refer to:

 Corn Hill, Longford, Leinster, Ireland
 Corn Hill, New Brunswick, Canada

See also
 Cornhill (disambiguation)